The Malaysian pied fantail (Rhipidura javanica) is a species of bird in the fantail family and one of 47 species in the genus Rhipidura. It is locally referred to as murai gila, literally "crazy thrush" in the Malay language. It is found in Brunei, Cambodia, Indonesia, Laos, Malaysia, Myanmar, Philippines,  Singapore, Thailand, and Vietnam. Its natural habitat is subtropical or tropical moist lowland forests.

A single sight was recorded from Yala National Park of south Sri Lanka.

References

Malaysian pied fantail
Birds of Southeast Asia
Birds of Malaysia
Malaysian pied fantail
Taxonomy articles created by Polbot